1999 Czech Lion Awards ceremony was held on 27 February 1999.

Winners and nominees

Non-statutory Awards

References

1999 film awards
Czech Lion Awards ceremonies